The warbling doradito (Pseudocolopteryx flaviventris) is a species of bird in the family Tyrannidae. It is found in swamps and riparian habitats in central and northern Argentina, Paraguay, Uruguay and southern Brazil. The population breeding in Chile and western Argentina has usually also been included in the warbling doradito. It is visually extremely similar, but vocally distinctive and has recently been recognized as a separate species, the ticking doradito (P. citreola). Ebird, an online birding reference, describes the warbling doradito as a "Small two-toned flycatcher, olive-brown above and yellow below. Found in tall-grass marshes, especially those with sedges. Typically difficult to locate, but during the migration can be found in various areas with tall grass. The call is a series of nasal squeaky notes: 'chek, chek, chek, chek-chick-chick-chiquetik'."

References

warbling doradito
Birds of the Pampas
warbling doradito
Taxonomy articles created by Polbot